Joint Force Land Component Commander (JFLCC), is a United States Department of Defense doctrinal term. It is pronounced "Jay-Flick".

It refers to an individual of general officer rank that is responsible for land forces within a joint operations environment.  The term "land forces" encompasses ground forces such as infantry or armored units.

As defined in Joint Doctrine Document 1-02, the JFLCC is:

"The commander within a unified command, subordinate unified command, or joint task force responsible to the establishing commander for making recommendations on the proper employment of assigned, attached, and/or made available for tasking land forces; planning and coordinating land operations; or accomplishing such operational missions as may be assigned. The joint force land component commander is given the authority necessary to accomplish missions and tasks assigned by the establishing commander."

Confusion of term
While the position is usually held by a United States Army officer in most joint warfighting environments, an officer of another service can be a JFLCC, if that service has the preponderance of land forces in theater (i.e. a Marine Corps unit commander).

See also
Joint Force Air Component Commander (JFACC)
Joint Force Maritime Component Commander (JFMCC)

External links
Defense Technical Information Center: Joint Publication 1-02, DOD Dictionary of Military and Associated Terms 8 November 2010, as amended through 31 January 2011 JP 1-02
Defense Technical Information Center: JP 3-0, Joint Operations, 17 September 2006, Change 2, 22 March 2010
JP 3-31, Command and Control of Joint Land Operations, 24 Feb 2014  Doctrine for a JFLCC

United States military specialisms